Leptomorphus nebulosus is a species of fungus gnats in the family Mycetophilidae.

References

Further reading

External links

 Diptera.info

Mycetophilidae
Insects described in 1848